Sigaram is a 1991 Indian Tamil-language musical drama film directed by Ananthu and produced by Kavithalayaa Productions. The film stars S. P. Balasubrahmanyam, Rekha and Radha. It was released on 11 January 1991.

Plot 

Damodar is a famous music director and playback singer who has won many awards. Gnanam, the man behind his success, works hard for his breakthrough and he now considers Damodar as his archenemy. Damodar's son Krishna is a drunkard and spoils his life by drinking alcohol. In the past, Krishna was in love with Aparna, but there was a difference of opinion between the two, so they separated.

Later, Sukanya, Damodar's wife, dies by falling from stairs. Damodar then falls ill and Dr Priya takes care of him. Priya was a fan of Damodar and they were in love when they were young.

Thereafter, Gnanam steals Damodar's records in his studio and becomes one of the top music directors. In the meantime, Damodar gets well and Priya meets Aparna to talk about Krishna. Aparna admitted that she was cheated by her friend and she attempted to commit suicide but she failed to because she cannot forget her lover Krishna. Gnanam then apologises to Damodar for his misdeeds. Finally, Krishna marries Aparna, and Damodar and Priya also marry.

Cast 
 S. P. Balasubrahmanyam as Damodar
 Radha as Priya
 Rekha as Sukanya
 Anand Babu as Krishna
 Ramya Krishnan as Aparna
 Nizhalgal Ravi as Gnanam
 Charle as Madhavan
 Lalitha Kumari
 Delhi Ganesh as Sachidhanandam
 Nassar in a guest appearance
 Pyramid Natarajan in a guest appearance
 Mano in a guest appearance
 Babloo Prithiveeraj in a guest appearance

Production
Sigaram marked the directorial debut of Ananthu. He said he wrote this script in 1985.

Soundtrack 
The soundtrack was composed by S. P. Balasubrahmanyam, who also played the lead role, with lyrics written by Vairamuthu. The song "Itho Itho En Pallavi" is a remake of the song "Priya Priya Vinodave" from the 1987 Kannada film Sowbhagya Lakshmi, composed by Balasubrahmanyam. The song "Muthamma Ennai" is based on "Happy Together" by the Turtles, while the first line of "Vannam Konda" was inspired by the Hindi song "Kabhi Khud Pe" which was composed by Jaidev.

Release and reception 
Sigaram was released on 11 January 1991. Another critic wrote "Sigaram," an intimate portrait of a music director, played by SPB. Told in flashbacks, this presents the highs and lows of an artist as a series of vignettes that seem self-contained at times, but are tightly woven into a smooth narrative. With an eye for realism and a talent for profound dialogue, Ananthu makes this a memorable entry into the annals of parallel cinema." C. R. K. of Kalki wrote that though the songs were melodious, they were too many. The film was a commercial success, with Balasubrahmanyam attributing it to Vairamuthu's lyrics and Yesudas' singing.

References

External links 
 

1991 films
1990s Tamil-language films
Films scored by S. P. Balasubrahmanyam
1990s musical drama films
Indian musical drama films
1991 directorial debut films
1991 drama films